Thorntree is a housing estate in east Middlesbrough, North Yorkshire, England. The former Thorntree Ward's population was 6,290, at the 2011 census. Since 2015, the estate shares a ward with Brambles Farm.

The housing estate was built in the late 1940s, in the lands of the former Thorntree Farm, after people started to move away from the terraced housing of Middlesbrough town centre and North Ormesby. It has a public park called Thorntree Park. The main roads of the estate are College Road and The Greenway.

Thorntree Ward had a population of 5,000 and was identified as the 3rd most deprived (out of 8,414) housing ward in England, in 2000. Since the Index of Multiple Deprivation started measuring smaller output areas with a mean population of 1,500, the three areas of Thorntree later ranked 192nd, 205th and 378th most deprived (out of 34,412) in England respectively.

History
Much of Thorntree stands on what used to be a farmland.

Channel 4 - Secret Millionaire
The estate featured in the Channel 4, Reality TV show, Secret Millionaire, in 2006.  Millionaire Paul Williams, from the Green Energy company, Freetricity, and his 20-year-old son Ben lived undercover on Thorntree for 10 days.  At the end of the show, he gave £10,000 to local hairdresser, Gina Lawrence, to help her to train trainee hairdressers.  He also gave a further £10,000 to The Christian Centre (formerly Thorntree Community Church) Lunch Club, which they used to buy a minibus and fund the club.

Amenities

 Public House (1)
The Thorntree
 Schools (2)
Thorntree Primary School,
Caldicotes Primary School.
 Churches (2)
Corpus Christi Roman Catholic Church,
The Christian Centre.

References

External links

Neighbourhood Statistics
Caldicotes Primary School
Thorntree Primary School
The Christian Centre

Places in the Tees Valley
Areas within Middlesbrough